= Dhakti Suseri =

Village in Maharashtra

- Village
- Interactive map of Dhakti Suseri
- Country: India
- State: Maharashtra

Dhakti Suseri is a small village in Ratnagiri district, Maharashtra state in Western India. The 2011 Census of India recorded a total of 852 residents in the village. Dhakti Suseri's geographical area is approximately 192 hectares (470 acres).
